Who Pays the Ferryman? is a television series produced by the BBC in 1977. The title of the series refers to the ancient religious belief and mythology of Charon, the ferryman to Hades. In ancient times, it was custom to place coins in or on the mouth of the deceased before cremation so that the deceased could pay the ferryman to go to Hades.

The eight episodes were written by Michael J. Bird. He used his knowledge of Crete, where the series is based, incorporating local history and folklore. Helped by stunning scenery, the serial became a success when transmitted on BBC One in 1977.

Premise
A former soldier returns to Crete, to take stock after his boat-building business is bought out, thirty years after he had fought alongside the local resistance (andartes) during the Second World War. He finds the ghosts of the past waiting for him there, and those who would do him ill. The shadows of his past interrupt and threaten his present happiness.

Plot

After suffering personal and professional misfortunes, boat designer Alan Haldane (Jack Hedley) decides to take a trip to Crete after 30 years away. Now a widower and having sold his business, Haldane wishes to find new meaning and rediscover the sense of belonging just as he had experienced during the World War II. Back then, Haldane fought with the Andartes against the occupying German army; his skill and determination earned him the honorary name of "Leandros" and his exploits subsequently slipping into local legend. He had also enjoyed an affair with co-partisan Melina Matakis, from whom he temporarily parted when repatriation took place. Once back in England his letters to Melina went unanswered; hence, this temporary parting became permanent.

Now at a loose end, Haldane is met by many, a mainly positive welcome, many remembering the exploits of the one they called "Leandros." On reaching the area where he was based with Melina, a local homeowner, Annika, approaches. As glances are exchanged, this pretty and successful businesswoman and Haldane unconsciously form an immediate rapport. Annika had divorced her husband—an action in opposition to the values of Crete—however, this strong woman and Haldane get on so easily and both recognise a need for each other which grows ever stronger each time their paths cross, which in time will become understandably frequent.

Haldane at last manages to meet up with his Greek 'brother' from whom he was almost inseparable during the war, a lawyer named Babis Spiridakis. Haldane is pleased to see Babis, but the latter merely acknowledges Leandros' presence after an admittedly long time apart. But they talk and as facts are eased out into the open, both men are in for a few surprises. It turns out both Melina and Haldane wrote letters to each other, which neither received. Haldane discovers Melina died four years ago. That might have been that, but Babis goes on to explain that Melina was pregnant with his child, a daughter, who with her husband runs a tavern. They have now gone on to bear him what is his grandchild. The magical bond between Haldane and Annika gets immediately complicated when Babis tells Haldane that Annika is actually the sister of Melina, therefore his daughter's aunt.

Leandros is determined to get to know his daughter and grandchild without any of them knowing. And he can never tell Annika, with whom he is falling deeply in love, because what he knows would tear everyone's world apart. In addition, those who still hold age-old vendettas plot against Leandros, such as Annika's matriarchal mother, Katerina. The stage is set for a Greek tragedy, in which all parts were cast many years earlier, to play right out to the bitter end.

Filming
The serial's location sequences were shot in and around Elounda. The serial's theme tune, composed by Yannis Markopoulos, reached the UK singles chart in late 1977 and early 1978.

Credits

Main cast
Jack Hedley as Alan Haldane
Betty Arvaniti as Annika Zeferis
Stefan Gryff as The Major
Neil McCarthy as Babis Spiridakis
Takis Emmanuel as Matheos Noukakis
Patience Collier as Katerina Matakis
Nikos Verlekis as Nikos Vassilakis
Maria Sokali as Elena Vassilakis
Alexis Sergis as Alexis Vassilakis

Crew
 Series created and written by Michael J. Bird
 Produced and directed by William Slater
 Designs by Myles Lang
 Theme music composed by Yannis Markopoulos

Episodes

Availability
The series was available on DVD in the Netherlands (Wie betaalt de veerman?) some time before the UK release in 2012.

External links
  Michael J. Bird tribute website
 

BBC television dramas
1970s British drama television series
1977 British television series debuts
1977 British television series endings
1977 in Greece
Lasithi
Films set in Crete
Films shot in Greece
Films shot in Crete
English-language television shows